Louise M. Weiser (1837–1898) became president  of Winnesheik County Bank in 1875. She was the first woman to serve as president of an American bank.

Biography 
Weiser was born in Vermont. She married Horace Weiser around 1860 and moved to Decorah, Iowa.

Horace was founder and president of Winnesheik County Bank. Upon Horace's death in 1875, Louise assumed the role of bank president making her the first woman in the United States to hold such a position. Her son, C.S. Weiser became president of the bank in 1892.

References 

American bank presidents
1837 births
1898 deaths
Businesspeople from Vermont
American women bankers
People from Decorah, Iowa
19th-century American businesspeople